B. Traven (Bruno Traven in some accounts) was the pen name of a novelist, presumed to be German, whose real name, nationality, date and place of birth and details of biography are all subject to dispute. One  certainty about Traven's life is that he lived for years in Mexico, where the majority of his fiction is also set—including The Treasure of the Sierra Madre (1927), the film adaptation of which won three Academy Awards in 1948.

Life
Virtually every detail of Traven's life has been disputed and hotly debated. There were many hypotheses on the true identity of B. Traven, some of them wildly fantastic. The other name most commonly identified with Traven is Ret Marut, a German stage actor and anarchist, who had edited an anarchist newspaper in Germany called Der Ziegelbrenner (The Brick Burner). Traven's widow Senora Rosa Elena Lujan accepted that her husband and Marut were one and the same in a statement after his death in 1969. Marut was a pseudonym and probably derived from Hindu mythology. His career as an actor and later pamphleteer has been traced from 1907 by Rolf Recknagel and in detail by Jan-Christophe Hauschild.

Of all the names given for the author only one has ever been traceable to a documented birth. This was Hermann Albert Otto Maximilian Feige, born in Schwiebus in Brandenburg on 23 February 1882. This name and date was given by Marut to the American Embassy in London in 1923 when applying for a passport. This name is not universally accepted though no contradictory evidence has been produced. B. Traven in Mexico is also connected with the names of Berick Traven Torsvan and Hal Croves, both of whom appeared and acted in different periods of the writer's life. Both denied being Traven, claiming they were  his literary agents only, representing him in contacts with his publishers. This fooled few.

B. Traven is the author of twelve novels, one book of reportage and several short stories, in which the sensational and adventure subjects combine with a critical attitude towards capitalism. B. Traven's best known works include the novels The Death Ship from 1926, The Treasure of the Sierra Madre from 1927 (filmed in 1948 by John Huston), and the so-called "Jungle Novels", also known as the Caoba cyclus (from the Spanish word caoba, meaning mahogany). The Jungle Novels are a group of six novels (including The Carreta and Government), published in the years 1930–1939 and set among Mexican Indians just before and during the Mexican Revolution in the early 20th century. He claimed to have an uncle living in Germany called Yanson Jorinson, who he said lived approximately from 1847 to 1931, but, like Traven, there is not much more known about Jorinson.

Traven's novels and short stories became very popular as early as the interwar period and retained this popularity after the Second World War; they were also translated into many languages. Most of B. Traven's books were published in German first, with their English editions appearing later; nevertheless, the author always claimed that the English versions were the original ones and that the German versions were only their translations. This claim is mostly treated by Traven scholars as a diversion or a joke, although there are those who accept it.

Works

Novels 

The writer with the pen name B. Traven appeared on the German literary scene in 1925, when the Berlin daily Vorwärts, the organ of the Social Democratic Party of Germany, published the first short story signed with this pseudonym on February 28. Soon, it published Traven's first novel, Die Baumwollpflücker (The Cotton-Pickers), which appeared in installments in June and July of the same year. The expanded book edition was published in 1926 by the Berlin-based Buchmeister publishing house, which was owned by the left-leaning trade-unions-affiliated book sales club Büchergilde Gutenberg. The title of the first book edition was Der Wobbly, a common name for members of the anarcho-syndicalist trade union Industrial Workers of the World; in later editions the original title Die Baumwollpflücker was restored. In the book, Traven introduced for the first time the figure of Gerald Gales (in Traven's other works his name is Gale, or Gerard Gales), an American sailor who looks for a job in different occupations in Mexico, often consorting with suspicious characters and witnessing capitalistic exploitation, nevertheless not losing his will to fight and striving to draw joy from life.

In the same year (1926), the book club Büchergilde Gutenberg, which was Traven's publishing house until 1939, published his second novel Das Totenschiff (The Death Ship). The main character of the novel is again Gerard Gales, a sailor who, having lost his documents, virtually forfeits his identity, the right to normal life and home country and, consequently, is forced to work as a stoker's helper in extremely difficult conditions on board a "death ship" (meaning a coffin ship), which sails on suspicious voyages around the European and African coasts. The novel is an accusation of the greed of capitalist employers and bureaucracy of officials who deport Gale from the countries where he is seeking refuge. In the light of findings of Traven's biographers, The Death Ship may be regarded as a novel with autobiographical elements. Assuming that B. Traven is identical with the revolutionary Ret Marut, there is a clear parallel between the fate of Gale and the life of the writer himself, devoid of his home country, who might have been forced to work in a boiler room of a steamer on a voyage from Europe to Mexico.

Traven's best known novel, apart from The Death Ship, was The Treasure of the Sierra Madre, published first in German in 1927 as Der Schatz der Sierra Madre. The action of the book is again set in Mexico, and its main characters are a group of American adventurers and gold seekers. In 1948 the book was filmed under the same title (The Treasure of the Sierra Madre) by the Hollywood director John Huston. The film, starring Humphrey Bogart and Walter Huston, was a great commercial success, and in 1949 it won three Academy Awards.

The figure of Gerald Gales returned in Traven's next book, The Bridge in the Jungle (Die Brücke im Dschungel), which was serialized in Vorwärts in 1927 and published in an extended book form in 1929. In the novel, Traven first dealt in detail with the question of the First Nations in South and North America and the conflicting values and traditions between white settler cultures and indigenous cultures throughout the Americas; these themes detailing the problems of colonization dominated the Jungle Novels published in the 1930s.

In 1929 B. Traven's longest book The White Rose (Die Weiße Rose) was published; this was an epic story (supposedly based on fact) of land stolen from Native American people by an American oil company.

The 1930s are mainly the period in which Traven wrote and published the so-called Jungle Novels – a series of six novels consisting of The Carreta (Der Karren, 1931), Government (Regierung, 1931), March to the Monteria (Der Marsch ins Reich der Caoba, 1933), Trozas (Die Troza, 1936), The Rebellion of the Hanged (Die Rebellion der Gehenkten, 1936), and The General from the Jungle (Ein General kommt aus dem Dschungel, with a Swedish translation published in 1939 and the German original in 1940). The novels describe the life of indigenous Mexicans in the state of Chiapas in the early 20th century who are forced to work under inhumane conditions at clearing mahogany in labour camps (monterias) in the jungle; the working and living conditions lead to a rebellion and the outbreak of the Mexican Revolution.

After the Jungle Novels, B. Traven practically stopped writing longer literary forms, publishing only short stories, including the novella or Mexican fairy tale Macario, which was originally published in German in 1950. The story, whose English title was The Healer, was honored by The New York Times as the best short story of the year in 1953. Macario was made adapted into a film by Mexican director Roberto Gavaldón in 1960.

Traven's last novel, published in 1960, was Aslan Norval, the story of an American millionairess who is married to an aging businessman and at the same time in love with a young man; she intends to build a canal running across the United States as an alternative for the nuclear arms race and space exploration programs. The subject and the language of the novel, which were completely different from the writer's other works, resulted in its rejection for a long time by publishers who doubted Traven's authorship; the novel was accused of being "trivial" and "pornographic". The book was only accepted after its thorough stylistic editing by Johannes Schönherr who adapted its language to the "Traven style". Doubts about Aslan Norval remain and exacerbate the problems of the writer's identity and the true authorship of his books.

Other works 
Apart from his twelve novels, B. Traven also authored many short stories, some of which remain unpublished. Besides the already mentioned Macario, the writer adapted the Mexican legend about The Creation of the Sun and the Moon (Sonnen-Schöpfung, with a Czech translation published in 1934 and the German original in 1936). The first collection of Traven's short stories, entitled Der Busch, appeared in 1928; its second, enlarged edition was published in 1930. From the 1940s onwards many of his short stories also appeared in magazines and anthologies in different languages.

A solitary position in Traven's oeuvre is held by Land des Frühlings (Land of Springtime, 1928), a travel book about the Mexican state of Chiapas that doubles as a soapbox for the presentation of the leftist and anarchist views of its author. The book, published by Büchergilde Gutenberg like his other works, contained 64 pages of photographs taken by B. Traven himself. It has not been translated into English.

Themes 
B. Traven's major writings are classified as adventure novels with proletarian themes. They tell about exotic travels, outlaw adventurers and Indians; many of their motifs can also be found in Karl May's and Jack London's novels. Unlike much of adventure or Western fiction, Traven's books, however, are not only characterized by a detailed description of the social environment of their protagonists but also by the consistent presentation of the world from the perspective of the "oppressed and exploited". Traven's characters are drawn commonly from the lower classes of society, from the proletariat or lumpenproletariat strata; they are more antiheroes than heroes, and despite that they have this primal vital force which compels them to fight. The notions of "justice" or Christian morality, which are so visible in adventure novels by other authors, for example Karl May, are of no importance here.

Instead, an anarchist element of rebellion often lies at the centre of the novel's action. The hero's rejection of his degrading living conditions frequently serves as motive and broad emphasis is placed upon the efforts of the oppressed to liberate themselves. Apart from that, there are virtually no political programmes in Traven's books; his clearest manifesto may be the general anarchist demand "¡Tierra y Libertad!" in the Jungle Novels. Professional politicians, including ones who sympathize with the left, are usually shown in a negative light, if shown at all. Despite this, Traven's books are par excellence political works. Although the author does not offer any positive programme, he always indicates the cause of suffering of his heroes. This source of suffering, deprivation, poverty and death is for him capitalism, personified in the deliberations of the hero of The Death Ship as Caesar Augustus Capitalismus. Traven's criticism of capitalism is, however, free of blatant moralizing. Dressing his novels in the costume of adventure or western literature, the writer seeks to appeal to the less educated, and first of all to the working class.

In his presentation of oppression and exploitation, Traven did not limit himself to the criticism of capitalism; in the centre of his interest there were rather racial persecutions of Mexican Indians. These motifs, which are mainly visible in the Jungle Novels, were a complete novelty in the 1930s. Most leftist intellectuals, despite their negative attitude to European and American imperialism, did not know about or were not interested in persecution of natives in Africa, Asia or South America. It has been argued that Traven deserves credit for drawing public attention to these questions, long before anti-colonial movements and struggle for civil rights of black people in the United States.

Identity 

Traven submitted his works himself or through his representatives for publication from Mexico to Europe by post and gave a Mexican post office box as his return address. The copyright holder named in his books was "B. Traven, Tamaulipas, Mexico". Neither the European nor the American publishers of the writer ever met him personally or, at least, the people with whom they negotiated the publication and later also the filming of his books always maintained they were only Traven's literary agents; the identity of the writer himself was to be kept secret. This reluctance to offer any biographical information was explained by B. Traven in words which were to become one of his best-known quotations: "The creative person should have no other biography than his works."

The non-vanity and non-ambition claimed by Traven was no humble gesture, Jan-Christoph Hauschild writes: 

Although the popularity of the writer was still rising – the German Brockhaus Enzyklopädie devoted an article to him as early as 1934 – B. Traven remained a mysterious figure. Literary critics, journalists and others were trying to discover the author's identity and were proposing more or less credible, sometimes fantastic, hypotheses.

List of works

B. Traven – Stand-alone works 
 The Cotton-Pickers (1926; retitled from The Wobbly) 
 The Treasure of the Sierra Madre (1927; first English pub. 1935) 
 The Death Ship: The Story of an American Sailor (1926; first English pub. 1934) 
 The White Rose (1929; first full English pub 1979) 
 The Night Visitor and Other Stories (English pub. 1967) 
 The Bridge in the Jungle (1929; first English pub. 1938) 
 Land des Frühlings (1928) – travel book – untranslated
 Aslan Norval (1960)  – untranslated
 Stories by the Man Nobody Knows (1961)
 The Kidnapped Saint and Other Stories (1975)
 The Creation of the Sun and the Moon (1968)

B. Traven – The Jungle Novels
 Government (1931) 
 The Carreta (1931, released in Germany 1930) 
 March to the Monteria (a.k.a. March to Caobaland) (1933) 
 Trozas (1936) 
 The Rebellion of the Hanged (1936; first English pub. 1952) 
 A General from the Jungle (1940)

B. Traven – Collected stories
 Canasta de cuentos mexicanos (or Canasta of Mexican Stories, 1956, Mexico City, translated from the English by Rosa Elena Luján)

Films based on works by B. Traven
 The Treasure of the Sierra Madre, 1948
 The Rebellion of the Hanged, 1954
 Canasta de cuentos mexicanos, 1955
 The Argonauts (Episode of Cheyenne TV series), 1955
 Der Banditendoktor (TV film), 1957
 The Death Ship, 1959
 Macario (story "The Third Guest"), 1960
 Rosa Blanca (novel La Rosa Blanca), 1961
 Días de otoño (story "Frustration"), 1963
 Au verre de l'amitié, 1970
 Die Baumwollpflücker (TV series), 1970
 The Bridge in the Jungle, 1971
 Kuolemanlaiva (TV film), 1983
 La rebelión de los colgados, 1986

Notable illustrations of works by B. Traven
 Dödsskeppet (The Death Ship), Atlantis, Stockholm 1978, and Het dodenschip, Meulenhoff, Amsterdam 1978. Inkdrawings by the Swedish artist Torsten Billman. Unpublished in English.

Works by Ret Marut
 To the Honorable Miss S... and other stories (1915–19; English publication 1981) 
 Die Fackel des Fürsten (novel, Nottingham: Edition Refugium 2009) ;
 Der Mann Site und die grünglitzernde Frau – (novel, Nottingham: Edition Refugium 2009) ;

References 
Notes

Bibliography

 Baumann, Michael L. B. Traven: An introduction, 
 Baumann, Michael L. Mr. Traven, I Presume?, AuthorHouse, online 1997, 
 Chankin, Donald O. Anonymity and Death: The Fiction of B. Traven, 
 Czechanowsky, Thorsten.  'Ich bin ein freier Amerikaner, ich werde mich beschweren'. Zur Destruktion des American Dream in B. Travens Roman 'Das Totenschiff' ' , in: Jochen Vogt/Alexander Stephan (Hg.): Das Amerika der Autoren, München: Fink 2006.
 Czechanowsky, Thorsten. Die Irrfahrt als Grenzerfahrung. Überlegungen zur Metaphorik der Grenze in B. Travens Roman 'Das Totenschiff' in: mauerschau 1/2008, pp. 47–58.
 Dammann, Günter (ed.), B. Travens Erzählwerk in der Konstellation von Sprache und Kulturen, Würzburg, Königshausen & Neumann, 2005; 
 Giacopini, Vittorio. L'arte dell'inganno, Fandango libri 2001 (in Italian)  
 
 Guthke, Karl S. B. Traven. Biografie eines Rätsels, Frankfurt am Main, Büchergilde Gutenberg, 1987, 
 Guthke, Karl S. "Das Geheimnis um B. Traven entdeckt" – und rätselvoller denn je, Frankfurt am Main, Büchergilde Gutenberg, 1984, 
 Hauschild, Jan-Christoph: B. Traven – Die unbekannten Jahre. Edition Voldemeer, Zürich / Springer, Wien, New York 2012, .
 Hauschild, Jan-Christof: Das Phantom: Die fünf Leben des B. Traven. Edition Tiamat 2018
 Heidemann, Gerd. Postlagernd Tampico. Die abenteuerliche Suche nach B. Traven, München, Blanvalet, 1977, 
 Mezo, Richar Eugene. A study of B. Traven's fiction – the journey to Solipaz, San Francisco, Mellen Research University Press, 1993, 
 Pateman, Roy. The Man Nobody Knows: The Life and Legacy of B. Traven, 
 Raskin, Jonah, My Search for B. Traven, 
 Recknagel, Rolf. B. Traven. Beiträge zur Biografie, Köln, Röderberg Verlag, 1991, 
 
 Stone, Judy, The Mystery of B. Traven, .
 Thunecke, Jörg (ed.) B. Traven the Writer / Der Schriftsteller B. Traven, Edition Refugium: Nottingham 2003, 
 Wyatt, Will. The Secret of the Sierra Madre: The Man who was B. Traven, Houghton Mifflin Harcourt, 1985,

External links 

 B. Traven (1890–1969) Link collection at Socialistisk Bibliotek, Progressive Online Library                
 B. Traven Website of the International B. Traven Society
 Helen Tapio, B. Traven's Identity Revisited, University of Helsinki, Department of History
 
 "B. Traven", from the Anarchist Encyclopedia
 "B. Traven – An Anti-Biography", biography with pictures from libcom.org
 Frank Nordhausen, "Der Fremde in der Calle Mississippi", Berliner Zeitung, March 11, 2000
 B. Traven in Lexikon der Anarchie
 The B. Traven Collections at UC Riverside Libraries
 Kurt Tucholsky, Kurt Tucholsky, "B. Traven" (review), Die Weltbühne of November 25, 1930
 Peter Neuhauser, "Der Mann, der sich B. Traven nennt", Die Zeit, May 12, 1967
 Rolf Cantzen, "Die Revolution findet im Roman statt. Der politische Schriftsteller B. Traven", SWR Radio broadcast and transcript
 Rolf Raasch, "B. Traven: ein deutsch-mexikanischer Mythos"
 Larry Rohter, "His Widow Reveals Much Of Who B. Traven Really Was", The New York Times, June 25, 1990
 James Goldwasser, Ret Marut – The Early B. Traven
 Chris Harman, B. Traven – Voice of the Hanged 
 Jan-Christoph Hauschild, "Ein Virtuose des Verschwindens". In: Neue Zürcher Zeitung, August 30, 2009, p. 30.
 Jan-Christoph Hauschild, "B. Traven – wer ist dieser Mann?" In: FAZ, July 17, 2009
 The historical residence of Otto Feige aka Ret Marut aka B. Traven in Świebodzin, Poland.

19th-century births
1960s deaths
Year of birth unknown
Forestry in Mexico
Anarcho-syndicalists
German anarchists
German anti-capitalists
German male novelists
German socialists
Mexican anarchists
Mexican male writers
Mexican novelists
Mexican socialists
Mexican syndicalists
Proletarian literature
20th-century pseudonymous writers
Unidentified people